The Southern League Cup is a knock-out cup competition organised by the Southern Football League. For the 2017–18 season, the competition is known as the BigFreeBet.com Challenge Cup for sponsorship reasons. It is understood that the majority of funds from the sponsorship deal are being put into developing English grassroots football.

History

Winners

Winners to 1993 source:

Names
 1984-    : Bill Dellow Cup
 1987-1990: Westgate Insurance Cup
 1990-1991: Larchimage Windows Cup
 1991-1993: Barclays Commercial Services Cup
 1993-2004: Doc Martens Cup
 2005-2007: Errea Cup
 2008-2009: GX Cup
 2009-2011: Red Insure Cup

References

External links
 Southern League Website

Southern Football League
Recurring sporting events established in 1933
Football cup competitions in England